Isidro Vildosola is a Filipino para-athlete who competed in the 2012 Summer Paralympics in London.

Background
A native of Koronadal, South Cotabato, Vildosola lost his right arm as a boy in 1999 at a rice mill in Marbel, South Cotabato after he saved the life of a cousin whose malong gut stuck in a grinding machinery.
 After the incident, his father disowned him. Isidro was left with his mother. In high school, he was able to excel against abled-bodied competitors in a varsity meet which helped him secure athletic scholarship at the University of Southern Mindanao. He viewed Eduardo Buenavista as his running idol.

Vildosola's participation in the 2005 Milo Marathon National Finals led him to an opportunity to represent the Philippines in international competitions. Since then he have competed in the ASEAN Para Games and Asian Para Games. When training he focus on conditioning his amputated right appendage to counter the lack of balance caused by his disability. He also competed for his country in the 2012 Summer Paralympics in London.

In triathlon, Vildosola was part of the Wetshop Para-Tri team. He also competed in the 2015 IPC Athletics World Championships, which was part of the 2015 London Marathon.

References

Paralympic track and field athletes of the Philippines
Athletes (track and field) at the 2012 Summer Paralympics
Filipino amputees
Sportspeople from South Cotabato
Year of birth missing (living people)
Living people
Filipino male middle-distance runners
Medalists at the 2010 Asian Para Games